Ban Jelačić Square is the central square of the city of Zagreb, Croatia, named after Ban Josip Jelačić. The official name is Trg bana Jelačića. The square is colloquially called Jelačić plac.

It is located below Zagreb's old city cores Gradec and Kaptol and directly south of the Dolac Market on the intersection of Ilica from the west, Radićeva Street from the northwest, the small streets Splavnica and Harmica from the north, Bakačeva Street from the northeast, Jurišićeva Street from the east, Praška Street from the southeast and Gajeva Street from the southwest. It is the center of the Zagreb Downtown pedestrian zone.

History 

 
The square's history begins in 1641, when a new marketplace was created on a plain below Gradec and Kaptol, near Manduševec spring. Over time, buildings and access roads were constructed around the marketplace. The location, initially called Manduševec, was later named Harmica. The oldest standing building, dating from the 18th century, is situated at 1 Ban Jelačić Square.

In 1826, the cattle market was relocated to what is now Zrinjevac Park. Groceries, transported to Harmica on carts, continued to be sold there until 1858.

In 1848, the square was renamed to its present name. A large statue of Ban Josip Jelačić on a horse, created by Austrian sculptor Anton Dominik Fernkorn was installed on 19 October 1866 by Austrian authorities, despite protests from Zagreb councilmen. It also caused unease amongst Hungarians, who see Jelačić as a traitor.

A horsecar line passing through the square's southern side was introduced in 1891. In 1910–11 horses were replaced by electric trams.

In 1946, the square was renamed to Trg Republike (Republic Square). Jelačić's statue was removed in 1947 as the new Communist government of SFR Yugoslavia denounced him as a "servant of foreign interests". Antun Bauer, a curator of the Gliptoteka gallery, kept it in the gallery cellar.

After World War II, car traffic through the square intensified. In 1975, the square became a car-free zone.

Modern square 

The 1987 Summer Universiade (World University Games) was held in Zagreb. The city used the event to renovate and revitalize the city. The square was repaved with stone blocks and made part of the downtown pedestrian zone. A part of the Medveščak stream, which had been running under the sewers since 1898, was uncovered by workers. This part formed the Manduševac fountain that was also covered in 1898.

On 11 October 1990, during the breakup of Yugoslavia and after 1990 elections in Croatia, and Jelačić's historic role has again been considered positive and the statue was returned to the square but on the north portion facing the south. The name of the square has again been changed to his second name, after Josip Jelačić.

Jelačić Square is the most common meeting place for people in Zagreb. Being a part of the pedestrian zone, it is inaccessible by car, but it is the main hub for trams. ZET tram lines 1, 6, 11, 12, 13, 14, 17 traverse it by day, and 31, 32 and 34 by night.

The present-day square features buildings belonging to different architectural styles ranging from classicism, secession and modernism. Many of them have antique façades which require renovation. This makes them a common target for advertisers, who cover the construction work with large posters.

The square features the Manduševac fountain located in its eastern part.  The square is adorned with Christmas trees and lights at Christmas.

Gallery

References

External links
 

Squares in Zagreb
Donji grad, Zagreb
Gornji Grad–Medveščak